Operation Barracuda was a military operation by France during 1979-1981, to return to power the former President of the Central African Republic, Mr David Dacko. It followed up Operation Caban of 21 September 1979, a bloodless military operation in which Emperor Bokassa I of the Central African Empire was overthrown.

History

Barracuda was led by French Colonel Bernard Degenne, based in N'Djamena (the capital of Chad), who gave the code name Barracuda to four Aérospatiale SA 330 Puma helicopters and four Transall C-160 transport aircraft, which carried elements of the 8th Marine Infantry Parachute Regiment to the Central African capital of Bangui. At noon, a company of the 3rd Marine Infantry Parachute Regiment from Libreville (the capital of Gabon), was also transported to Bangui.

Until November 1979, Barracuda aimed to protect French citizens in the country and the Dacko government, in addition to supporting the Central African Armed Forces (FACA) in maintaining order. Afterwards, it aimed to rebuild and instruct FACA to ensure the stability of the country. Barracuda ended in June 1981 and was replaced by the "French Elements of Operational Assistance" which remained in the Central African Republic until 1998.

Footnotes

1979 in the Central African Republic
Central African Republic–France relations
Military operations involving France
Conflicts in 1979